El Palacio de Hierro (officially El Palacio de Hierro S.A. de C.V.) is an upscale chain of department stores in Mexico. It is the largest department store in Latin America and has been a member of the International Association of Department Stores since 2000.

History

In the 1850s, a clothing store opened in Mexico City called "Las Fábricas de Francia" (The Factories of France) which was owned by Victor Gassier, a Frenchman (not to be confused with the currently Fábricas de Francia chain, operated by Liverpool).  In 1860, Gassier teamed up with Alexander Reynaud, forming a business called Gassier & Reynaud.

In 1876, José Tron, his brother Henri and José Leautaud bought in, forming the association V. Gassier & Reynaud, Sucs. S. en C. In 1879 the business' formal name was changed to J. Tron y Cía..  However, it continued to trade as "Las Fábricas de Francia". From here Tron and Leautaud's endeavor met with considerable success.

In 1879, they began planning to build a department store in Mexico City similar to upscale stores in Paris (Le Bon Marché), New York City (Saks Fifth Avenue), London (Harrods), and Amsterdam (De Bijenkorf).

In 1888 they bought land to construct their store.  They hired the Mexican architect Ignacio de la Hidalga for the project and construction was to last until 1891.

Tron and Leautaud chose to build a five-story building.  It was, notably the first building in Mexico City made of iron and steel.  As the first such structure in Mexico, people who passed by often asked "What iron palace are they building?". In 1891, when construction finished, Tron and Leautaud decided to rename the business "El Palacio de Hierro", taking advantage of the publicity they earned during construction.

On April 15, 1914 a fire destroyed the building. Other buildings were then used. With the end of the Mexican Revolution, construction began on a new building, designed by French architect Paul Dubois, was completed the building in 1921. The Art Nouveau building opened in 1920 with dual stained-glass ceilings by Jacques Grüber (1870-1936) of Nancy, France.

Nowadays, El Palacio de Hierro is part of Grupo BAL a diversified conglomerate in Mexico with interests in insurance, mining and retail

Product lines range from clothing, to houseware, furniture, jewelry, select foods, toys, spa, travel services, and electronics. Especially in the clothing area, it is a high-end retailer, carrying top Mexican domestic brands, as well as hosting many in-store boutiques from exclusive lines such as Emilio Pucci, Tiffany's, Tommy Hilfiger, Cartier, Esprit, Max Mara, BCBG Max Azria, Emporio Armani, Fendi, Louis Vuitton, Gucci, Tory Burch, Salvatore Ferragamo, Prada, Ermenegildo Zegna, Ralph Lauren, Chanel, Versace, Swarovski, Michael Kors, Burberry, Escada, Juicy Couture, Carolina Herrera, Mango, Bvlgari, Bottega Veneta, and Hermès.

Locations

Palacio de Hierro format

Greater Mexico City
The modern flagship store is the 4-story,  freestanding store in Polanco which the company gave the nickname "El Palacio de los Palacios", "the Palace of the Palaces"). The property originally was a mall, opened in 1997, including a Palacio store, and in 2015 the mall area was incorporated into the Palacio store as part of a total remodeling.

The original store and historic flagship, opened in 1891, is still open along the north side of Venustiano Carranza street in the Historic center of Mexico City, one block south of the Zócalo (main square), between 5 de Febrero and 20 de Noviembre avenues. 

There are also full-line Palacio de Hierro stores at:
Centro Coyoacán, opened 1989, to be replaced in late 2022 by a new branch at the new, adjacent Mítikah shopping center
Centro Santa Fe
Durango Avenue, Colonia Roma (freestanding store, opened 1958)
Paseo Interlomas, opened 2011
Perisur, opened 1980
Plaza Satélite, opened 1998

Elsewhere in Mexico
There are full-line Palacio de Hierro department stores in:
 Guadalajara, in Andares shopping center, opened 2008
 Monterrey, in Paseo San Pedro, opened 2005
 Puebla, in Angelópolis Lifestyle Center, opened 2002
 Querétaro, in Antea LifeStyle Center, opened 2014
 Villahermosa, in Plaza Altabrisa, opened 2012
 Veracruz, in Andamar Lifestyle Center

Other formats
Greater Mexico City has, in addition:
Boutique Palacio at Paseo Acoxpa, Tlalpan borough, opened 2010
Casa Palacio at Antara Polanco, opened 2006
Casa Palacio at Centro Santa Fe, opened 2013
Palacio Outlet at Punta Norte Premium Outlets

Elsewhere:
 Acapulco has 1 Casa Palacio and 1 Boutique Palacio, opened 2008
 Cancún has 1 Casa Palacio in La Isla Shopping Village and 1 Boutique Palacio, opened 2010
 Lerma de Villada, State of Mexico has 1 Palacio Outlet

References

External links

eCommerce Site
Official Site
Photo Gallery

1850 in Mexico
Retail companies established in 1850
Companies based in Mexico City
Palacio de Hierro
Mexican brands